The Czech Pirate Party leadership election of 2016 was held on 2 April 2016. Ivan Bartoš was elected the new leader. Members of the party were allowed to vote through internet.

Background
Election was scheduled for meeting in Olomouc. The incumbent leader Černohorský decided to not run. Ivan Bartoš who previously led the party decided to run and was considered the front-runner.

Voting
Voting took place on 2 April 2016. Members of the party voted via internet. Bartoš received 126 votes while Bajgar only 32. Bartoš became the new leader.

References

Czech Pirate Party leadership elections
2016 elections in the Czech Republic
Czech Pirate Party leadership election